Twin Bridges Rural Historic District is a historic district in Chadds Ford Township, Delaware County, Pennsylvania and Pennsbury Township, Chester County, Pennsylvania which was listed on the National Register of Historic Places in 2017.

Its nomination asserted that the districtexhibits a cohesive collection of distinctive architectural resources and landscape features that identify it as an important enclave in the Lower Brandywine Creek Valley of the two types of country estates that were being created within the time frame of the American Country Estate Movement. The Period of Significance for the proposed Twin Bridges Rural Historic District begins in 1914 with the acquisition of the first farm that became part of the Bissell Estate and ends in 1947 when Beverly Farm was broken up and sold, and falls within the period of time (the mid-Nineteenth through the mid-Twentieth Centuries) when wealthy Americans were emulating the English aristocratic life style of refined country living. It includes the years when its three prominent families -- the Bissells (1914-1929), the Haskells (1916-1930), and the Holladays (1916-1930) -- acquired a number of farms to create their respective country estates.

References

Historic districts on the National Register of Historic Places in Pennsylvania
National Register of Historic Places in Chester County, Pennsylvania
National Register of Historic Places in Delaware County, Pennsylvania